O Cravo e a Rosa is a Brazilian telenovela produced and broadcast by Rede Globo. It premiered on 26 June 2000 and ran until 10 March 2001. It is based on the Shakespearean comedy The Taming of the Shrew.

Plot
The plot involves a single farmer who needs money to save his land, and a wealthy politician who is willing to get his oldest daughter married at any cost. The plan is complicated by the politician's daughter, who is a feminist who rejects the role of a housewife.

This romantic comedy is set in the 1920s, and inspired by The Taming of the Shrew by William Shakespeare.

Cast

Opening
The opening song is Jura, by Zeca Pagodinho.

Ratings
O Cravo e a Rosa aired at 6:00 p.m. and had an overall average rating of 30.6 points.

Soundtrack 
Cover: Leandra Leal

 "Jura" - Zeca Pagodinho (Opening theme)
 "Olha o que o Amor Me Faz" - Sandy & Junior
 "O Cravo e a Rosa" - Jair Rodrigues
 "Nada Sério" - Joanna
 "Tristeza do Jeca" - Sérgio Reis
 "Mississippi Raq" - Claude Bolling
 "Quem Toma Conta de Mim (Someone To Watch Over Me)" - Paula Toller
 "Lua Branca" - Verônica Sabino
 "Odeon" - Sérgio Saraceni
 "Coquette" - Guy Lombardo
 "Tua Boca" - 
 "Tea For Two" - Ella Fitzgerald & Count Basie
 "Rain" - Sérgio Saraceni
 "On The Mississippi" - Claude Bolling

Foreign run
O Cravo e a Rosa aired on Canal 9 (Argentina) and Portugal's Sociedade Independente de Comunicação and RTP Internacional.

References

External links 
 

Brazilian telenovelas
TV Globo telenovelas
2000 telenovelas
2000 Brazilian television series debuts
2001 Brazilian television series endings
Works based on The Taming of the Shrew
Telenovelas by Walcyr Carrasco
Portuguese-language telenovelas